André Brüllmann (born 7 August 1934) is a Swiss gymnast. He competed in eight events at the 1960 Summer Olympics.

References

1934 births
Living people
Swiss male artistic gymnasts
Olympic gymnasts of Switzerland
Gymnasts at the 1960 Summer Olympics
Sportspeople from Geneva